The Garret Lydecker House is located in Englewood, Bergen County, New Jersey, United States. The house was built in 1808 and was added to the National Register of Historic Places on January 9, 1983.  It is now part of the local senior center.

See also
National Register of Historic Places listings in Bergen County, New Jersey

References

Englewood, New Jersey
Houses on the National Register of Historic Places in New Jersey
Houses completed in 1808
Houses in Bergen County, New Jersey
National Register of Historic Places in Bergen County, New Jersey
New Jersey Register of Historic Places